Sergei Mikhaylovich Puchkov (born 12 January 1985) is a Russian former football midfielder. He also holds Ukrainian citizenship as Serhiy Mykhaylovych Puchkov.

Club career
He started playing in the Ukrainian second and third tier in the FC Dynamo Kyiv system.

He made his debut in the Russian Second Division for FC Dolgoprudny on 20 April 2013 in a game against FC Karelia Petrozavodsk.

References

External links
 Career summary by sportbox.ru
 

1985 births
Living people
Ukrainian footballers
Russian footballers
Association football midfielders
FC Borysfen-2 Boryspil players
FC Dynamo-3 Kyiv players
FC Dynamo-2 Kyiv players
FC Olimp-Dolgoprudny players